Estremoz is a municipality in Portugal. The population in 2011 was 14,318, in an area of 513.80 km². The city Estremoz itself had a population of 7,682 in 2001. It is located in the Alentejo region.

History

The region around Estremoz has been inhabited since pre-historic times. There are also vestiges of Roman, Visigoth and Muslim occupation.

During the Reconquista, Estremoz was captured in the 12th century by the army of knight Geraldo Sem Pavor (Gerald the Fearless), who had also conquered neighbouring Évora. However, Estremoz was soon retaken by the Moors and only in the mid-13th century was it reconquered by the Portuguese King Sancho II.

An important strategic site between the Kingdoms of Portugal and Castile, Estremoz received a charter (fuero) in 1258 from Afonso III after the Moors were driven out a second time, which promoted Christian colonization in the area. King Dinis rebuilt the castle as a royal palace, further promoting the area. His widow, Dowager Queen Elizabeth of Portugal, died in Estremoz castle on July 4, 1336, shortly after mediating a peace treaty between her son Alfonso IV of Portugal and grandson Alfonso XI of Castile. Her grandson Pedro I of Portugal died in the Franciscan monastery at Estremoz in 1367. During the 1383–1385 Crisis, Nuno Álvares Pereira established his headquarters in Estremoz, then defeated the Castilian forces at the Battle of Atoleiros.

During the Portuguese Restoration War (1640–1668), Portuguese forces (including from Estremoz) defeated the Castilians in the nearby and decisive Battles of Ameixial (1663) and Montes Claros (1665).

Geography
Administratively, the municipality is divided into 9 civil parishes (freguesias):
 Ameixial (Santa Vitória e São Bento)
 Arcos
 Estremoz (Santa Maria e Santo André)
 Évora Monte (Santa Maria)
 Glória
 São Bento do Cortiço e Santo Estêvão
 São Domingos de Ana Loura
 São Lourenço de Mamporcão e São Bento de Ana Loura	
 Veiros

Economy

Together with the two other marble towns, Borba and Vila Viçosa, Estremoz is internationally known for its fine to medium marble that occurs in several colours: white, cream, pink, grey or black and streaks with any combination of these colours. Especially the pink marble (Rosa Aurora and Estremoz Pink) is in high demand.

This marble has been used since Antiquity as a material for sculpture and architecture. The first exports in Roman times were probably for the construction of the Circus Maximus of Emerita Augusta, in modern-day Spain. The Portuguese navigators exported this marble to Africa, India and Brazil. The marble from this region was used in famed locations such as the Monastery of Jerónimos, the Monastery of Batalha, the Monastery of Alcobaça and the Tower of Belém.

There is so much marble around Estremoz that it is used everywhere; even the doorsteps, pavements and the cobble stones are made out of marble. This marble is even converted into whitewash for painting the houses.

Portugal is the second largest exporter of marble in the world, surpassed only by Italy (Carrara marble). About 85% of this marble (over 370,000 tons) is produced around Estremoz.

In the quarries marble blocks are cut from the rock with a diamond wire saw, a durable steel cable with a series of circular diamond beads. The initial conduit for the wire is made by drilling a horizontal hole and a vertical hole of which the ends meet exactly inside the rock. The wire saw may need a day to cut through the marble. The Estremoz marble has been designated by the International Union of Geological Sciences as a Global Heritage Stone Resource.

Architecture

Archaeological
 Atalaia das Casas Novas/Atalaia da Frandina

Civic
 Café Aguias d'Ouro
 Estremoz Caixa Geral dos Depósitos
 Estremoz Postal, Telegraph and Telephones (CTT)
 Jailhouse of Estremoz
 Municipal Palace/Hall of Evoramonte
 Municipal Palace/Hall of Estremoz
 National Tuberculosos Assistance Dispensary

Military
 Castle of Estremoz
 Castle of Evoramonte
 Castle of Vieros

Religious
 Chapel of Nossa Senhora da Conceição
 Chapel of Nossa Senhora dos Mártires
 Chapel of Santa Margarida
 Convent of the Congregation
 Convent of Santo António
 Convent of São Francisco
 Cross of the Misericórdia
 Cross of São Francisco
 Hermitage of Nossa Senhora da Conceição

Notable people 
 Etienne de Brito (1567–1641) a Roman Catholic prelate, Archbishop of Cranganore and Titular Bishop of Salona
 Francisco de Melo (1597–1651) a Portuguese nobleman who served as a Spanish general.
 João de Sousa Carvalho (1745– c.1798) the foremost Portuguese composer of his generation.
 António de Spínola (1910–1996) a Portuguese military officer, author and conservative politician
 Rita Rato (born 1983) a Portuguese politician and director of the Cadeia do Aljube museum
 Paulo Sérgio (born 1968) a Portuguese retired footballer with 331 club caps

References

External links

Official website
Photos from Estremoz

 
Municipalities of Portugal
Cities in Portugal